The Bern Botanical Garden (BOGA) is a botanical garden located in Bern, the capital city of Switzerland.

The garden is listed as a cultural property of national significance.

References

External links 
 
 Web site of the garden

Botanical gardens in Switzerland
Cultural property of national significance in the canton of Bern
Tourist attractions in Bern